An isosceles triangle is a triangle with two equal sides.

Isosceles may also refer to:
Isosceles (band), an indie pop band from Scotland
Isosceles set, a set of points all triples of which form isosceles triangles
Isosceles shooting stance, a posture in which the arms and chest of the shooter describe an isosceles triangle
Isosceles trapezoid, a trapezoid with two equal sides

See also
Isosceles triangle theorem, the theorem that isosceles triangles have two equal angles
Isosceles Peak, a mountain in Canada